L'Essentiel may refer to:

Publications
L'essentiel (newspaper), free newspaper in Luxembourg (2007-)
, regional magazine of La Rochelle (1996-)

Music
L'Essentiel many individual French compilation albums, of which the more notable include:
(fr) Daniel Balavoine 1995
a 2003–2004 series by EMI France, including:
fr  Jeanne Mas 2003
fr Mireille Mathieu 2003 
L'Essentiel (Mano Negra album) 2004